The Night Manager is a Hindi-language crime thriller television series created by Sandeep Modi, which serves as not a remake of the British television series The Night Manager (2016) based on the John Le Carre's novel of the same name.

The Night Manager stars Anil Kapoor, Aditya Roy Kapur and Sobhita Dhulipala, and Tillotama Shome, Ravi Behl, Saswata Chatterjee in supporting roles.

Plot 
Shantanu 'Shaan' Sengupta, a former Lieutenant in the Indian Navy, is currently working as a night manager in a premiere star hotel in Dhaka, amidst the Rohingya genocide in 2017. He is approached by Safina Kidwai, a 14 year-old girl married to the majority share owner of the star hotel, Freddie Rehman, to help her escape to India. Upon his refusal, she steals his phone and discreetly records a meeting in Shaan's phone between Shaildendra 'Shelly' Rungta and her Freddy, about buying and smuggling illegal arms into Bangladesh. She also takes pictures of the paperwork and returns the phone to Shaan, so that he can view everything. Upon seeing everything, he goes to his friend, Vikram Bhagwat, of the Indian High Commission in Dhaka, to share the information and evidence. 

Vikram, in-turn, sends the information to RAW officer, Lipika Saikia Rao, who is the in-charge of Bangladesh, in New Delhi. She has been keeping tabs on Shelly and believes that the evidence she received from Safina and Shaan is enough to officially go after him. She requests Shaan to keep Safina safe for a night, till she arrives in Dhaka the next afternoon. Meanwhile, both Freddie and Shelly come to know about their meeting being leaked; Shelly asks Freddie to kill Safina. He, along with his men, search the entire hotel for her. Shaan takes Safina to a new wing that is currently under construction in the star hotel, for safekeeping. The next day, as he goes out to get food for Safina, he calls Lipika to inquire about her current whereabouts, however, Lipika realizes that her phone has been bugged and orders Shaan to hurry back to Safina. He comes back just as Safina falls to her death from the wing. Her death is ruled as a suicide by the local police, who say that she stole jewelry from the high-profile guests in the hotel and jumped as she was caught. This devastates both Shaan and Lipika, knowing completely well that both Freddie and Shelly were behind her death. This prompts Shaan to leave his job.

Two years later, Shaan now lives a reclusive life in Shimla, working as a night manager in a star resort. He is constantly haunted by his failure of not being able to save Safina back in Dhaka. However, one day, his superior tells him that Shelly, along with his associates, is coming to stay in the resort for a few days. Once they arrive, Shaan collects strong information, from the trash in his room, and mails it to Lipika. Over the course of his stay, Shelly constantly runs into Shaan. Each time, he is impressed with Shaan's demeanor. He even gives his coat to Shaan, as token of remembrance, as he leaves the resort. The next day, Shaan is visited by an undercover Lipika, who has now been demoted to the archives section of the agency. They both decide to infiltrate Shelly's syndicate. After a dramatic set-up orchestrated by Lipika and her co-worker, Sarang, Shaan is able to reach Sri Lanka, by posing as an international runaway, to get close to Shelly. 

He saves his son, Taha, in a fake kidnapping planned by Lipika. However, to further make it look real, he purposefully gets injured. Upon seeing and searching Shaan, both Shelly and his righ-hand man, Brij Pal alias BJ, find a Sri Lankan passport with a different alias, on him. They decide to take him with them, for his recuperation. Shaan, as a result, successfully infiltrates Shelly's gang and succeeds in creating chaos amongst them. Shaan eventually finds out that Shelly is on the verge of bankruptcy and plans to go to Riyadh, to meet Bargati, an oil baron, with the hopes of making a deal with him. He also finds out that he has an Indian partner going by the alias, Indra Dhanush. Using Shelly's lawyer, G. V., Lipika plants a set-up in Riyadh, to get BJ arrested, under homosexuality, which is banned in the Middle East. After it is successful, Shelly, with no other way out, offers Shaan the CEO position, which was previously occupied by BJ, for 30 days. Intending to take him out from the inside, Shaan happily agrees to the offer.

Cast 
 Anil Kapoor as Shailendra Rungta, Shelly
 Aditya Roy Kapur as Shantanu Sengupta Shaan Sobhita Dhulipala as Kaveri 'K' Dixit, Shailendra's girlfriend
 Tillotama Shome as Lipika Saikia Rao, R &W Officer
 Ravi Behl as Jaiveer 'Jayu' Singh, Shelly's associate
 Rukhsar Rehman as Mrinal Singh, Jaiveer's wife
 Saswata Chatterjee as Brij Pal alias BJ, Shelly's right-hand man
 Varun Shashi Rao as Naren Rao
 Anand Vikas Potdukhe as Sarang Potdukhe
 Bagavathi Perumal as D'Silva, Lipika's contact in Sri Lanka
 Jagdish Rajpurohit as Nasser Loshkar, Shaan's superior in Dhaka
 Salim Siddiqui as P. Tiwari, Policeman
 Resh Lamba as Freddie Rehman, Shelly's associate and owner of the star hotel in Dhaka
 Arista Mehta as Safina Kidwai Rehman, Freddie's wife
 Supriya Shukla as Farzana Kidwai, Safina's mother
 Shrenik Arora as Taha Rungta, Shelly's son
 Joy Sengupta as Danish Khan, Lipika's superior in the RAW
 Akashdeep Sabir 
 Owais Bhatt
 Bhupendra Singh Negi
 Vikram Kapadia
 Vipul Deshpande
 Episodes 

 Filming 
The series was shot in Shimla, Jaisalmer, Delhi, Mumbai, Sri Lanka, Bangladesh and Middle East.

 Release The Night Manager premiered on Disney+ Hotstar on 17 February 2023.

 Reception The Night Manager is the first Indian TV series set to feature on the new cover authored by John le Carre.The Night Managers cast performance mostly received positive reviews.

Anuj Kumar of The Hindu wrote "The series also provides a platform for some understated performers to showcase their talent. Aditya Roy Kapoor finally gets a role where his performance matches his personality. The writing demands a certain emotional gravitas from him, and Aditya delivers."

Saibal Chatterjee for NDTV wrote "Because this version of the series takes four episodes to portray what was packed into three in the 2016 British production, it ends at a point where a great deal still remains to be unpacked."

Rohan Naahar for The Indian Express rated 3 stars out of 5 and wrote "The first part contains just four episodes, and the second, a pre-cap reveals, will arrive in June. Will audiences even be interested in returning to the series in three months? Who knows? Especially if they have access to the original as well."

Deepa Gahlot for Rediff.com wrote "The series, with Sandeep Modi as showrunner and co-director with Priyanka Ghose, gets the superficial trappings of the plot but not the complicated circuitry that makes the Le Carré novel tick."

Roktim Rajpal of India Today rate 2.5 star out of 5 and wrote "The Night Manager loses its steam from the second episode onwards. Several inherently intriguing sequences fail to pack a punch. The kidnapping sequence is perhaps the weakest of the lot. It lacks the intensity needed to make an impact."

Dishya Sharma for News18 wrote "Like most series, The Night Manager also witnesses a dip in pace in the third episode, slowly laying out all the cards. However, due to the abrupt end to the series, the dip doesn’t fully shoot up in the fourth episode, leaving you hanging midair."

Ajit Andhere of Deccan Chronicle wrote "For some reason, only the first part of the series comprising four episodes has been released with the announcement of the next to follow soon. However, this serves as a major hindrance as the story is known to all already."

Nandini Ramnath for Scroll.in felt Tillotama Shome played the most valuable role and wrote "eceptively bumbling, resourceful, and ruthless when she needs to be, Shome’s Lipika is a perfectly judged scene-stealer who gives the defanged remake the bite it is missing when its leads are around."

Reviewing the series, Tina Das of ThePrint wrote "While comparisons with the original are unavoidable, the adaptation to suit an Indian viewership does not dilute the experience. The themes of alienation of each character, and of dealing with the ghosts of the past emerge every few minutes, especially for Shaan."

Notes

References

External links 
 

2023 web series debuts
Disney+ Hotstar original programming
Indian television series based on British television series
Hindi-language Disney+ Hotstar original programming